The Kobo Arc, a 7" tablet originally ran on Android Ice Cream Sandwich 4.0.4 and running on Android Jellybean 4.1, is manufactured by Kobo Inc. It was released in November 2012. The tablet has access to Google Play applications.

The 2013 refresh of the Kobo Arc HD includes 7-inch and 10-inch versions. All use Android Jelly Bean 4.2.2.  The Arc 10HD has 2560×1600 resolution, Tegra 4 quad-core processor 1.8 GHz, 1.3 MP front camera, two speakers, 2 GB of RAM, 16 GB of storage, Bluetooth 4.0 and Miracast. The Arc 7HD has 1920×1200 resolution, Tegra 3 at 1.7 GHz, a 1.3 MP front camera, 1 GiB of RAM, and either 16 or 32 GiB of storage. The Arc 7 is a 7-inch tablet with a 1024×600 resolution.

History

2nd Generation
In August 2013, Kobo unveiled three additional Kobo Arc tablets. These were the Kobo Arc 10HD, Kobo Arc 7HD, and Kobo Arc 7.  The Kobo Arc 10HD is a 10.1-inch tablet with 2560×1600 resolution, while Kobo Arc 7HD is a 7-inch tablet with 1920×1200 resolution, and Kobo Arc 7 is a 7-inch tablet with a 1024×600 resolution.

Specs

See also

 Comparison of e-readers

References

External links
 .

Arc
Android (operating system) devices
Tablet computers
Tablet computers introduced in 2011
Touchscreen portable media players